The Said Sultan Ali Mosque is a mosque in Baghdad, Iraq. It is among the cultural heritages of the city, located at the southern part of the historical neighborhood of Rusafa at Al Rasheed Street, near the Al-Ahrar bridge, adjacent to the Tigris. The mosque was first established in 1590, under the rule of Ali Pasha. The name of the mosque is derived from the Said Sultan Ali who was buried in it.

Construction
The mosque contains a madrasa, where some well known ulamas such as sheikh Ahmad Shakes al-Alusi had taught. It also has tekyeh known as Tekyeh Quratun Ali. The mosque is attached by the minaret built of bricks, taking the shape of the Ottoman architectural style and decorated with blue tiles. The haram reaches  and can accommodate 1,000 worshipers. The haram has old mihrab and minbar, with the inscriptions of the Qur'anic verses over the wall.

On the left side in the mosque is the shrine and mausoleum of Said Sultan Ali, whose identity remains unsolved, with some people identifying him as the father of Ahmad al-Rifa`i, the founder of the Rifa`i tariqa. However, the Iraqi historian Muhammad Bahja al-Athari considers him as the a descendant of Imam Jafar al-Sadiq, Sultan Ali ibn Ismail ibn Jafar, and finds the former theory as a fabrication. Another revered saint, Imam Al-Rawas is buried next to Sultan Ali. 

On the righthand side exists the entrance to the madrasa, and the tomb of Khatun bint Darush Jalabi. On the center exists the entrance to the corridor of the mosque.

See also

 Islam in Iraq
 List of mosques in Iraq

References

16th-century mosques
Mosques in Baghdad
Ottoman mosques in Iraq